First Breath is the first album by Danish extreme metal band Mercenary. With this album, the band showed their death metal roots. First Breath was recorded at the Aabenraa Studio in Denmark.

Track listing

Personnel
Nikolaj Brinkmann - lead guitar
Jakob Mølbjerg - rhythm guitar
Henrik "Kral" Andersen - vocals, bass
Rasmus Jacobsen - drums

Guest appearances
Irene Poulsen - vocals on "Horizon" and "Sister Jane"
Jakob Sivsgård - keyboards on "Horizon" and "Demon8"

Production
Produced and engineered by Jacob Hansen
Mixed by Jacob Hansen and Kræn Meier

References

1998 debut albums
Mercenary (band) albums
Albums produced by Jacob Hansen
Hammerheart Records albums